During her 20+ years career, Latifa released more than 30 music video, one movie, one play and appeared as herself in the Arabic version "Lahathat Harijah" (لحظات حرجة) of the TV show ER.

This is Latifa's videography in chronological order, most recent releases to older ones.

Note. Translated English titles and Romanization of Arabic and Transliteration by Latifa's official site.

2010 production

2009 production

2008 production

2007 production

2006 production

2005 production

2003 production

2002 production

1999 - 2000 production

1998 production 

Note. That year Latifa shoot two more music videos of the songs "Khaleek Ba'ed" (Arabic: خليك بعيد) Translation: Keep away and the song "Ha Yeteeb Al Jarh" (Arabic: ح يطيب الجرح) Translation: My wound will heel but they were never released since Latifa had a nervous breakdown.

1997 production

1996 production

1995 production

1994 production

1993 production

Unknown years of production

See also 

 Latifa
 Latifa discography

External links
 Some of Latifa's music videos in her official website

Music videographies